The Holy Cross Church (N. Low Saxon: Hilligkrüüzkark; , more formal also: Kirche zum Heiligen Kreuz) is the church of the Neuenwalde Convent. However, church and parsonage (also part of the Convent property), are used per usufruct by the Lutheran Neuenwalde Congregation in Neuenwalde, a locality of Geestland, Lower Saxony, Germany.

History
After the Convent had moved from Wolde, present Altenwalde, new church and convent buildings were erected on a land spit in the midst of fens at the brink of the Wesermünde Geest, presently known as Neuenwalde. The church adopted its naming from the Holy Cross, a relic of which remained in the incorporated Chapel of the Holy Cross and St. Willehadus on the Mount (i.e. hill; est. 13th century, abandoned between 1590 and 1629) in Altenwalde. Since 1181, and on until 1648, the area formed part of the Prince-Archbishopric of Bremen. The convent Church of the Holy Cross thus simultaneously served as parish church for the Neuenwalders.

On 30 November 1390 the convent received a papal indulgence, presumably for repairs to the Holy Cross Church. In 1400 Prince-Archbishop  granted an indulgence of forty days to all who aided with new constructions with the Holy Cross Church. In 1428  renewed the convent's privilege of granting indulgences both for visiting the Holy Cross Church on certain feast days as well as for material aid in building and decorating it.

On New Year's Day 1500, the surviving mercenaries — trekking on towards Saxe-Lauenburgian Hadeln — ravaged and plundered the nunnery, before burning it to ashes. Choirbooks, documents, tapestries, chasubles, and paraments were lost in the fire. In 1503 the papal legate, Cardinal Raymond Peraudi, granted the convent an indulgence-privilege allowing for the reconstruction of the cloister.

In 1584 the first Lutheran pastor is recorded for the Holy Cross Church. Since the preachers were to be appointed in consensus with the prioress, the employment of a Lutheran pastor indicates the conversion of most Neuenwalde nuns to Lutheranism by then. With their advowson the prioresses blocked the intention of Bremen's Bederkesa bailiffs (the Bailiwick of Bederkesa [Amt Bederkesa] being between 1381/1421 and 1654 under the city's rule) to install Reformed preachers, unlike in Bederkesa proper, Debstedt, Flögeln, and Ringstedt where the conversion then succeeded.

On 6 June 1629 playing children caused a fire, destroying the Holy Cross Church and all the convent buildings. The reconstruction started right away. The Holy Cross Church was restored between 1630 and 1634 with most of its interior dating back to the following decades. During the Catholic Leaguist and Imperialist occupation of the Bremen prince-archbishopric, on 17/27 July 1630O.S./N.S. church and convent, still under reconstruction, were conveyanced to Roman Catholic Jesuits, as provided by the Edict of Restitution. However, this did not last for long but until the second half of April 1632, after the Swedish victory in the Battle of Rain, the Imperialist and Leaguist occupiers left the prince-archbishopric again and with them the foreign Catholic clergy.

Church building
 The Holy Cross Church was started in 1334 and its erection and embellishment lasted quite some time as shown by the indulgences granted to further its construction and decoration. The tower, like the church proper, based on erratic boulders, stands west of the church, but separately, and its western façade forms a building sightline with the southerly adjacent but structurally unconnected convent building called the Altes Kloster.

Today's church building, covering , is divided from west to east into eight bays. The six older, westerly bays are built from brick in Klosterformat (height: , length: ,) which is why the western part of the church is dated to the 1330s. Also the structure of the individual bricks and the alternating but irregular bonding of headers and stretchers there speaks for this dating. Since the 15th century bricklaying usually followed regular bondings.

 After the fires of 1500 and 1629 the church had been reconstructed either times using the surviving outside brickwork structures. Stefan Amt's constructional examinations in 2005 – during the renovation – revealed that the present building is no completely new construction but only the present roof and interior date to the repair after 1630. However, today's ceiling is flat, the original vaults have not been reconstructed. As of 1634 the convent's new Provost Otto Asche(n)  looked after the reconstruction. By 1636 the major structure was restored. The completion and decoration of the interior extended until the end of the 17th century. 
Since the mid-19th century congregation (user) and knighthood (owner) negotiated about an extension of the church building since not all churchgoers could be seated. In the second half of the 19th century the windows of the sixth bay were replaced by higher and wider ones. In 1888 on the instigation of Prioress von Düring these large windows were adorned with coloured glass.

 The position of quire and altar in Catholic times is indicated by bricked-up tabernacle niches (Sakramentsnischen) in the northern and southern walls of the sixth, originally last bay before the quire. The new northeastern façade was partially built with brick in Klosterformat gained from the rubble of the demolished old quire. Maybe also on this occasion the former bridged passage between the Altes Kloster convent building and the western loft in the church, with the bricked-up door in the first southern bay on first-floor level, was removed, at least the filling bricks laid are the same as those used for the eastern extension.

Between 2003 and 2005 the Bremian Knighthood – supported by the congregation, the deanery, the Church of Hanover, the European Union and the Marion-Köser-Stiftung foundation – thoroughly renovated the church. In 2009 a board displaying the escutcheons of the 20 member families of today's Bremian Knighthood was hung east of the loft on the northern wall in the church.

Furnishings
From the late 14th century one chalice remains. The chalice is silver traced with gold. Also a paten in the same style and from the same time has been preserved.

 In the gable above the northern entrance, located at the second western bay, there is the wall-mounted sandstone slab for Provost Nikolaus Minstedt the Elder (Mynstede), who died in 1508. This late Gothic epitaph displays him kneeling his hands lifted in prayer underneath the crucified Jesus Christ flanked by John the Baptist and Mary, mother of Jesus. The text in minuscule letters at the slab's bottom describes the provost's beneficial work for the Neuenwalde Convent.

There are two , structurally separate ground-level or elevated loges typical for Northern German church interiors once used to seat prominent persons such as pastors or feudal lords. Both are at grade and presently located at the walls of the 1910 extension. The northern one is named the Amtmannsstuhl (bailiff's seat), the southern named the Pfarrstuhl (pastor's seat, behind the pulpit), both dating from to the first half of the 17th century. The baptismal font of 1664 displays the coat of arms of Justino von Heshausen. The pulpit was created in the 17th century too.

 
The altar was created in 1690. The painter Nikolaus Bernütz from Hamburg decorated the altar until 1693. The central altar piece, framed by decorative wood carvings, shows an oil painting of the Lord's Supper. In the altar's upper section, above the carved columns, there is an oil painting depicting the burial of Jesus within a medaillon surrounded by wood carvings.

Today's L-shaped western organ loft, was decorated in 1695 also by Bernütz. In 1979 Dieter Eckstein dendrochronologically dated five beams carrying the present loft to have been logged by or after 1633. In the same position, then spreading over the three western bays, used to be the nuns' loft (Nonnenempore), however,  lower.

 Since from the beginning the walls of the western three bays were built showing a two-floor structure with separate upper and lower windows, unlike the easterly following bays where this is reached by bricking up bigger window openings, the nuns' loft must have spanned over the three western bays. The nuns' loft used to be connected by a little bridge directly to the first floor of the Altes Kloster convent building where the conventuals have their apartments.

The Jugendstil windows in the 1910-built new quire were donations by the families von Bergen and von Glahn who grew wealthy in the United States of America. These stained glass windows display biblical scenes. The window left of the altar displays the Nativity of Jesus, the right one the Resurrection of Jesus at Easter.

Organ
 In 1887 Johann von Bergen, who had returned from his emigration in the United States as a wealthy man, donated mark (ℳ) 2,500 for an organ in his hometown church.  from Stade was commissioned and the organ was the second work of his own, after he had left the organ workshop of his father and brother and opened his own organ workshop.
In 1917 the mute pipes in the casing front were requisitioned for war purposes. Thin wooden boards painted like pipes were then installed instead. In 1929 G. Wohlert from Lehe installed an electric wind system which is stationed in the bellows chamber in the church attic. In 1930 , Leipzig, carried out a thorough cleaning and overhaul.

In 1983 , Walsrode, restored the organ. On this occasion also the fake case front pipes were again replaced by real ones. The fake pipes are now stored in the bellows chamber in the church attic.

The organ includes pallets (valves) in the windchest and a mechanical tracker action built by Röver. The stop action is pneumatically operated. Since the organ had never been converted to Baroque style the casing, the pipe material and the technical premises are still completely original. The organ thus preserved its original riches of tone. In June and July 2007 Katrin Haspelmath cleaned and overhauled the organ and her company takes continuously care of the instrument.

Disposition of the organ
 The organ disposes of two manuals and a pedal with ten stops. Its tone is of equal temperament. The manuals range from C to F'', whereas the pedal ranges from C to d'.

Hymendorf Chapel
Unlike the Holy Cross Church and the parsonage in Neuenwalde, both owned by the Bremian Knighthood, the chapel in Hymendorf, a village founded in 1829, is owned by the Neuenwalde Congregation. The chapel was originally a multi-purpose building used as the local school and place of worship. However, when in 1967 the local school closed the Neuenwalde Congregation acquired the building completely and adjusted it for its purposes.

Parish
Today's parish precinct of the Neuenwalde Congregation comprises Neuenwalde proper, two farmsteads in Holßel's fen settlement adjacent to Neuenwalde and Hymendorf.

Before the foundation of the Holy Cross Church the area of Neuenwalde formed part of the Debstedt parish. The priest of Debstadt objected the reduction of his revenues, which is why Neuenwalde's provost provided a one-off payment of Lübeck marks (M.lb.) 30 to that parish. Neuenwalde, like Debstedt, then (and until 1648) formed part of the Archdeaconry of Hadeln and Wursten, in personal union presided over by the dean of the Bremen Cathedral.

The Holy Cross Church was under the patronage right of the Neuenwalde Convent. The parish had to deliver a third of its revenues to the convent. The pilgrimage Chapel of Holy Cross and St. Willhadus on the Mount (i.e. hill) in Altenwalde also belonged to the convent. The transfer from Altenwalde to Neuenwalde in 1334 was combined with the incorporation of that chapel into the Holy Cross Church. In 1445 the Vicary of Saint Mary, in 1496 the Vicary of Saint Michael in the parish church of Ss. Cosmas and Damian in Altenwalde were incorporated into the Holy Cross Church. In the course of the Reformation, these incorporations were lost.

In 1648 the patronage to the Church was transferred from the convent to Bremen-Verden's monarch. The other estates and revenues of the convent were enfeoffed to the veteran and former Swedish Paymaster General Melchior Degingk (aka Degens; 1616–1683; later ennobled von Schlangenfel[d]t) as a fief heritable in the male line (Mannlehen).

Theesberg Cemetery
Neuenwalde's new cemetery was opened in 1974 on the Theesberg hill. In 1983 the world war memorial, in 1922 donated by ex-Neuenwalders in the USA, was relocated from the fire station to the Theesberg cemetery. A list of surnames given on the gravemarkers is found here. Surnames found on gravemarkers

Pastors
The advowson at the Holy Cross Church was first with the convent's provost and later with its prioress. In 1683 the Bremian Knighthood claimed the advowson, including it in the monastic statute (Klosterordnung) royally confirmed in the same year, erroneously assuming the advowson had been with Degingk before. Thus the Knighthood elected Pastor Valentin Bothe in 1687. Bremen-Verden's general government protested this and by a declaratory action enforced its advowson. Below is the list of pastors at the Holy Cross Church since its reconstruction after the 1629 fire.

 1636–1639: Johann Lastorff
 1639–1659: Martin Didichius 
 1659–1664: M. (Magister) Andreas Rostock 
 1664–1679: Herbert von Schapen
 1679–1681: Johann Caspar Willing 
 1681–1687: Johann Moritz Schultze 
 1688–1691: M. Valentin Bothe
 1692–1704: Johann Georg Koch
 1705–1727: M. Gabriel Max Berger
 1728–1748: Johann Christoph Loth
 1748–1757: Hector Daniel Wolf
 1757–1769: Johann Christian von Hanffstengel
 1769–1783: Georg Tobias Zeidler 
 1783–1785: vacancy
 1785–1803: Friedrich W. Karl Wilken 
 1803–1805: Melchior B. Hannsteden 
 1807–1830: Diedrich Christian Lange
 1831–1843: Georg Chr. Emanuel Schulze 
 1843–1852: Christian Heinrich Colpe 
 1852–1871: Franz Hermann Kedenburg
 1871–1885: Karl Johann Gustav Brünjes 
 1886–1891: Jürgen Fitschen 
 1892–1911:  (1866–1954)
 1911–1924: August de Boer 
 1924–1928: Friedrich Arnold Otto Ernst Elster 
 1929–1938: Johannes Heinrich Mindermann
 1939–1950: Wilhelm Stühl 
 1950–1965: Julius Horn
 1965–1974: Wilhelm Scheile 
 1976–1987: Hermann Runge
 1988–2013: Friedrich H. Hinrichsen-Mohr
 2013–present: Joachim Köhler

References
 Stefan Amt, Heilig-Kreuz-Kirche in Neuenwalde (expertise), Hanover: Büro für Historische Bauforschung, 2004.
 Stefan Amt,  Heilig-Kreuz-Kirche in Neuenwalde: Bauhistorische Untersuchung, Hanover: Büro für Historische Bauforschung, 2005.
 , Kloster Neuenwalde: zur Geschichte des ehemaligen Nonnenklosters und heutigen Damenstiftes Neuenwalde, Bremische Ritterschaft (ed.), Stade: Hansa-Druckerei Stelzer, 1993.
 Der frühere Kreis Lehe, Oskar Kiecker (compil.), Osnabrück: Wenner, 1980 [reprint = Der frühere Kreis Lehe, Oskar Kiecker (compil.), Hanover: Provinzialverwaltung Hannover, 1939, (=Die Kunstdenkmäler der Provinz Hannover [1899–1941]; vol. 25; =vol. 5 'Regierungsbezirk Stade', no. 2 'Die Kunstdenkmale des Kreises Wesermünde', pt. 1)], (=Kunstdenkmälerinventare Niedersachsens, vol. 43), ed. in collab. with the Niedersächsisches Landesverwaltungsamt / Institut für Denkmalpflege, . 
 Beate-Christine Fiedler, „Bremen und Verden als schwedische Provinz (1633/45–1712)“, in: Geschichte des Landes zwischen Elbe und Weser: 3 vols., Hans-Eckhard Dannenberg and Heinz-Joachim Schulze (eds.) on behalf of the Landschaftsverband der ehemaligen Herzogtümer Bremen und Verden, Stade: Landschaftsverband der ehemaligen Herzogtümer Bremen und Verden, 1995 and 2008, vol. I 'Vor- und Frühgeschichte' (1995), vol. II 'Mittelalter (einschl. Kunstgeschichte)' (1995), vol. III 'Neuzeit' (2008), (=Schriftenreihe des Landschaftsverbandes der ehemaligen Herzogtümer Bremen und Verden; vols. 7–9), vol. III: pp. 173–253. . 
 Christa Kraemer, „675 Jahre Kloster Neuenwalde — Rückblick auf viele Jahrhunderte Klosterleben“, in: Niederdeutsches Heimatblatt (No. 718, October 2009), p. 1. 
 Christa Kraemer, „Die Ritterschaft übernahm das Kloster: Vor 325 Jahren gaben die Schweden den Neuenwalder Besitz ab“, in: Niederdeutsches Heimatblatt (No. 728, August 2010), pp. 1seq. 
 Matthias Nistal, „Die Zeit der Reformation und der Gegenreformation und die Anfänge des Dreißigjährigen Krieges (1511–1632)“, in: Geschichte des Landes zwischen Elbe und Weser: 3 vols., Hans-Eckhard Dannenberg and Heinz-Joachim Schulze (eds.) on behalf of the Landschaftsverband der ehemaligen Herzogtümer Bremen und Verden, Stade: Landschaftsverband der ehemaligen Herzogtümer Bremen und Verden, 1995 and 2008, vol. I 'Vor- und Frühgeschichte' (1995), vol. II 'Mittelalter (einschl. Kunstgeschichte)' (1995), vol. III 'Neuzeit' (2008), (=Schriftenreihe des Landschaftsverbandes der ehemaligen Herzogtümer Bremen und Verden; vols. 7–9), vol. III: pp. 1–158. .
 , Nachrichten von dem adlichen Jungfrauenkloster Neuenwalde Herzogthums Bremen: Samt einer Anzeige der Generalkirchenvisitation in der Neuhäusischen Probstey, und Synoden in dem Beverstedter und Osterstadischen Kirchenkreise, Stade: Erbrich, 1758 
 Ida-Christine Riggert-Mindermann, „Neuenwalde — Das Damenstift der Bremischen Ritterschaft“, in: Evangelisches Klosterleben: Studien zur Geschichte der evangelischen Klöster und Stifte in Niedersachsen, Hans Otte (ed.), Göttingen: V & R Unipress, 2013, (=Studien zur Kirchengeschichte Niedersachsens; vol. 46), pp. 273–279. . 
 , „Einige Nachrichten von den ehemaligen Klöstern im Herzogthum Bremen“, in: Neues vaterländisches Archiv oder Beiträge zur allseitigen Kenntniß des Königreichs Hannover und des Herzogthums Braunschweig, Lunenburg: Herold & Wahlstab, 1822-1832, vol. 6, no. 2 (1828), pp. 191–232. 
 Heinz-Joachim Schulze, „Neuenwalde“ (article), in: Germania Benedictina: 12 vols. so far, Bayerische Benediktiner-Akademie München / Abt-Herwegen-Institut Maria Laach (ed.), St. Ottilien: EOS Verlag Erzabtei St. Ottilien, 1970seqq., vol. XI: 'Norddeutschland: Die Frauenklöster in Niedersachsen, Schleswig-Holstein und Hamburg' (1984), Ulrich Faust (compil.), pp. 429–446.  
 Ignaz Zeppenfeldt, „Historische Nachrichten von dem Kloster Neuenwalde im Herzogthum Bremen“, in: Neues vaterländisches Archiv oder Beiträge zur allseitigen Kenntniß des Königreichs Hannover und des Herzogthums Braunschweig, Lunenburg: Herold & Wahlstab, 1822–1832, vol. 8 (1825), pp. 233–245.

External links
 
 „Kirchengemeinden: Neuenwalde“ (i.e. Neuenwalde Congregation), on: Kirchenkreis Wesermünde (i.e. Wesermünde Deanery), retrieved on 15 January 2015.
 „Ev.-luth. Kirchengemeinde Neuenwalde mit Krempel und Hymendorf“ (i.e. Neuenwalde Congregation with Krempel and Hymendorf), on: Internetpräsenz der Ortschaft Neuenwalde (i.e. Website of Neuenwalde locality), retrieved on 2 December 2014
 „Die Heilig-Kreuz-Kirche“ (i.e. The Holy Cross Church), on: Kloster Neuenwalde: Aktuelles (i.e. Neuenwalde Convent), retrieved on 2 December 2014.
 „12. Heilig-Kreuz-Kirche und Kloster Neuenwalde“, in: Cuxland: Kirchen, Orgeln, Kunstschätze, Cuxland-Tourismus: Agentur für Wirtschaftsförderung Cuxhaven (ed.), Cuxhaven: no publ., [2012], on: Cuxland: Urlaubsland zwischen Nordsee, Weser und Elbe, retrieved on 21 January 2015.

Notes

Neuenwalde
Neuenwalde
Neuenwalde
Neuenwalde
Geestland
Neuenwalde
Neuenwalde
Neuenwalde
Neuenwalde